This is a record of Israel at the 1987 World Championships in Athletics.

Men's 400 metres hurdles

Qualifying heats

Women's long jump

Qualifying round - Pool 2

World Championships in Athletics
1987
Nations at the 1987 World Championships in Athletics